Nicholas James Vujicic (born 4 December 1982) is an Australian American Christian evangelist and motivational speaker of Serbian descent, born with tetra-amelia syndrome, a rare disorder characterised by the absence of arms and legs.

Early life
Vujicic was born in Melbourne, Australia, in 1982 to Dušanka and Borislav Vujičić, Serbian immigrants from Yugoslavia.

He was born without fully formed limbs and he was bullied at school because of it. At one point, he tried killing himself by drowning in his bathtub but he was saved and it didn't continue. According to his autobiography, his mother refused to see him or hold him when the nurse held him in front of her, and she and her husband went out of the hospital.

Originally, the toes of one of his feet were fused. An operation was performed to separate the toes so that he can use them as fingers to grab. He refers to it as his chicken drumstick.

He attended Runcorn State High School up in Queensland and has made a couple of appearances there by doing speeches.

When he was seventeen years old, Vujicic's mother showed him a newspaper article about a woman praying with a severe disability; he then started to give talks at his prayer group. Vujicic graduated from Griffith University at the age of 21 with a Bachelor of Commerce degree, with a double major in accountancy and financial planning.

Vujicic starred in the short film The Butterfly Circus. At the 2010 Method Fest Independent Film Festival, he was awarded Best Actor in a Short Film for his starring performance as well.

Beliefs
On his webpages, in a self-formulated "Statement of Faith", Vujicic states his adherence to born-again Christianity.

Personal life

On 9 March 2002, he moved to California. In 2008 in McKinney, Texas, near Dallas, he met Kanae Miyahara. They married on February 12, 2012. The couple has two sons and two daughters, and reside in Southern California.

Without any limbs, he is able to type 43 words per minute on a computer.

Books and publications
Vujicic's first book, Life Without Limits: Inspiration for a Ridiculously Good Life, was published by Random House in 2010 and has been translated into over 32 languages.

 Life Without Limits: Inspiration for a Ridiculously Good Life (2010); 
 Your Life Without Limits (2012); 
 Limitless: Devotions for a Ridiculously Good Life (2013); 
 Unstoppable: The Incredible Power of Faith in Action (2013); 
 The Power of Unstoppable Faith (2014); 
 Stand Strong (2015); 
 Love Without Limits (2016); 
 Be the Hands and Feet: Living Out God's Love for All His Children, February 13, 2018;

See also
Jennifer Bricker, an American acrobat born without legs
Hirotada Ototake, a Japanese sports writer and survivor of tetra-amelia syndrome
Joanne O'Riordan, an Irish Tetra-amelia syndrome survivor
Zion Clark,a professional wrestler with no legs and a survivor of Caudal regression syndrome

References

External links

1982 births
Living people
21st-century American male writers
21st-century American non-fiction writers
21st-century evangelicals
American Christian writers
American evangelicals
American male non-fiction writers
American motivational speakers
American people of Serbian descent
Australian emigrants to the United States
Australian evangelicals
Australian male non-fiction writers
Australian motivational speakers
Australian people of Serbian descent
Australian people with disabilities
Griffith University alumni
People from Brisbane
People from Melbourne
People with phocomelia
People with tetra-amelia syndrome
People without hands